Ciarán Lynch (born 13 June 1964) is a former Irish Labour Party politician who served as a Teachta Dála (TD) for the Cork South-Central constituency from 2007 to 2016.

He was educated at University College Cork, studying Social studies, and at the Waterford Institute of Technology, studying Humanities. Lynch has been a member of the constituency executive since 1999. He works as an Adult Literacy Organiser in Cork and is married with two children.

Lynch served as a member of Cork City Council from 2004 to 2007, and was elected to Dáil Éireann at the 2007 general election. He was re-elected at the 2011 general election. He was the Labour Party spokesperson on Housing and Local Government. Lynch launched the Simon Communities National Conference on Homelessness and Health in 2011.

He is brother-in-law to Kathleen Lynch who was a Labour Party TD for Cork North-Central.

He lost his seat at the 2016 general election.

See also
Families in the Oireachtas

References

External links
Ciarán Lynch's page on the Labour Party website

1964 births
Living people
Alumni of University College Cork
Labour Party (Ireland) TDs
Local councillors in Cork (city)
Members of the 30th Dáil
Members of the 31st Dáil
Alumni of Waterford Institute of Technology